IRS-1A, Indian Remote Sensing satellite-1A, the first of the series of indigenous state-of-art remote sensing satellites, was successfully launched into a polar Sun-synchronous orbit on 17 March 1988 from the Soviet Cosmodrome at Baikonur. Undertaken by the Indian Space Research Organisation (ISRO). It was a part-operational, part-experimental mission to develop Indian expertise in satellite imagery.

History 
The availability of Landsat imagery created a lot of interest in the science community. The Hyderabad ground station started receiving Landsat data on a regular basis in 1978. The Landsat program with its design and potentials was certainly a great model and yardstick for the IRS programme. IRS-1A was the first remote sensing mission to provide imagery for various land-based applications, such as agriculture, forestry, geology, and hydrology. The mission's long-term objective was to develop indigenous remote sensing capability.

Satellite description 
The satellite bus, measuring 1.56 m x 1.66 m x 1.10 metres, had the payload module attached on the top and a deployable solar panels stowed on either side. Attitude control was provided by four-momentum wheels, two magnetic torques, and a thruster system. Together, they gave an estimated accuracy of better than ± 0.10° in all three axes.

Instruments 
The three-axis-stabilised Sun-synchronous satellite carried LISS sensors which performed "push-broom" scanning in visible and near-infrared bands to acquire images of the Earth. Local equatorial crossing time (ECT) was fixed at around 10:30 of the morning.

Launch 
IRS-1A was launched on 17 March 1988, at 06:43:00 UTC.

Mission 
IRS-1A was operated in a Sun-synchronous orbit. IRS-1A successfully completed its mission on 1 July 1992 after operating for 4 years.

See also 

 Indian Remote Sensing

References

External links 
 ISRO IRS-1A link

Earth observation satellites of India
Spacecraft launched in 1988
1988 in India
India–Soviet Union relations
1988 in the Soviet Union